Peinador may refer to:

Raúl Peinador (born 1968), Spanish fencer
Vigo–Peinador Airport, an airport in Spain